Great Dalby is a village and former civil parish, now in the parish of Burton and Dalby, in the Melton district, in the county of Leicestershire, England, with a population of between 300 and 400. It is referred to in some UK census records as Dalby Magna. It is 3 miles south of Melton Mowbray.

History 
The parish church of St. Swithun was originally built during the 13th century and renovated several times since then. It is a Grade II* listed building.
The village's name derives from the Old English dalr-by meaning 'farm/settlement in a valley'.

In 1931 the parish had a population of 323. On 1 April 1936 the parish was abolished and to form "Burton and Dalby".

References

External links

Villages in Leicestershire
Former civil parishes in Leicestershire
Borough of Melton